General elections were held in the Gilbert and Ellice Islands on 19 March 1971.

Background
Prior to the elections constitutional changes saw the House of Representatives replaced with a 33-member Legislative Council consisting of 28 elected members, three ex officio members (the Assistant to the Resident Commissioner, the Attorney General and the Financial Secretary) and two civil servants.

Campaign
A total of 110 candidates contested the 28 elected seats, all running as independents. Of the 23 incumbent members, only 13 ran for re-election.

Results
Only five of the 23 incumbent MPs were re-elected, with eight of them losing their seat. Tekarei Russell became the first female member of the legislature. Director of Agriculture Ray Harberd and Director of Education Harry Urquhart were appointed as the two nominated official members.

Aftermath
The new Legislative Council met for the first time on 14 April. Reuben Uatioa was elected Leader of Government Business. An Executive Council was subsequently appointed by Resident Commissioner John Osbaldiston Field after consultation with Uatioa.

References

Gilbert
Elections in the Gilbert and Ellice Islands
1971 in the Gilbert and Ellice Islands
Non-partisan elections